Pangaeus is a genus of burrowing bugs in the family Cydnidae. There are about 14 described species in Pangaeus.

Species
These 14 species belong to the genus Pangaeus:

 Pangaeus aethiops (Fabricius, 1787) i c g
 Pangaeus bilineatus (Say, 1825) i c g b (peanut burrower bug)
 Pangaeus congruus (Uhler, 1877) i c g b
 Pangaeus docilis (Walker, 1867) g
 Pangaeus laevigatus g
 Pangaeus moestus Stal g
 Pangaeus piceatus Stål, 1862 g
 Pangaeus punctilineus Froeschner, 1960 i c g
 Pangaeus rubrifemur g
 Pangaeus rugiceps Horvath g
 Pangaeus serripes g
 Pangaeus setosus Froeschner, 1960 i c g
 Pangaeus tuberculipes Froeschner, 1960 i c g
 Pangaeus xanthopus g

Data sources: i = ITIS, c = Catalogue of Life, g = GBIF, b = Bugguide.net

References

Further reading

External links

 

Cydnidae
Articles created by Qbugbot